Ksudach (also known as Vonyuchy Khrebet Volcano) is a stratovolcano in southern Kamchatka, Russia. The 1907 eruption sent ash high into the atmosphere which was transported by the jet stream, leaving North America east of the Rocky Mountains unseasonably cold.
The summit area comprises overlapping calderas. Two lakes, Bolshoe and Kraternoe, are located within calderas at the summit of Ksudach. These lakes, along with hot springs and the surrounding wilderness, make the Ksudach Volcano region a popular trekking destination. In the event of renewed volcanic activity, its remote location minimizes its potential hazard to humans.

See also
List of volcanoes in Russia

References

External links 

Volcanoes of the Kamchatka Peninsula
Stratovolcanoes of Russia
Volcanic crater lakes
Mountains of the Kamchatka Peninsula
VEI-6 volcanoes
20th-century volcanic events
Calderas of Russia
Pleistocene calderas
Holocene calderas